Batelov is a market town in Jihlava District in the Vysočina Region of the Czech Republic. It has about 2,400 inhabitants.

Administrative parts
Villages of Bezděčín, Lovětín, Nová Ves and Rácov are administrative parts of Batelov.

Etymology
The name is derived from the personal name Batel.

Geography
The municipal territory lies in three geomorphological regions: the central part lies in the Křižanov Highlands, the northern part lies in the Křemešník Highlands, and the southern forested part lies in the Javořice Highlands. The Jihlava River flows through Batelov. There are several ponds around the market town.

History

The first written mention of Batelov is from 1272.

Sights
The landmark of the town square is the Church of Saints Peter and Paul. The church awas built in the mid-18th century and has a Neoclassical façade from 1836. A staircase lined with several valuable statues leads to the church.

There are two castles in Batelov called Old Castle and New Castle. The Old Castle is a one-storey Renaissance building from the second half of the 16th century. It served mostly as an administrative seat. The New Castle is a Neoclassical building with Renaissance core, which served as the seat of the nobility.

Notable people
Zdeněk Mahler (1928–2018), writer, screenwriter and musicologist

References

External links

Populated places in Jihlava District
Market towns in the Czech Republic